Glen William Burdon (born August 4, 1954) is a Canadian former professional ice hockey centreman who played 11 games in the National Hockey League for the Kansas City Scouts. Burdon played junior hockey with the Regina Pats of the Western Canada Hockey League and was selected by both the Scouts in the 1974 NHL amateur draft and the Edmonton Oilers of the World Hockey Association in the 1974 WHA Amateur Draft. Signing with the Scouts he made his NHL debut that year, also playing in the minor American Hockey League (AHL). He played parts of three more seasons in both the AHL and International Hockey League before retiring in 1979.

Career statistics

Regular season and playoffs

External links
 

1954 births
Living people
Baltimore Clippers players
Canadian expatriate ice hockey players in the United States
Canadian ice hockey defencemen
Edmonton Oilers (WHA) draft picks
Fort Wayne Komets players
Ice hockey people from Saskatchewan
Kansas City Blues players
Kansas City Scouts draft picks
Kansas City Scouts players
New Haven Nighthawks players
People from Rural Municipality of Lumsden No. 189, Saskatchewan
Providence Reds players
Regina Pats players